The South American Basketball Championship 1955 was the 16th edition of this tournament. It was played in Cúcuta, Colombia. The title holder is Uruguay.

Preliminary round

Final round

Final standings

References
FIBA Archive

1955
1955 in basketball
International basketball competitions hosted by Colombia
Champ
August 1955 sports events in South America
Cúcuta